Bègles (Gascon: Begla) is a commune in the Gironde department in southwestern France.

It is a suburb of the city of Bordeaux and is adjacent to it on the south. Bègles station has rail connections to Langon and Bordeaux.

Population

Personalities
Bègles was the birthplace of:
 Sandrine Cantoreggi (born 1969), violinist 
 Lilly Daché (1898–1989), milliner and fashion designer
 Jacques Dufilho (1914–2005), actor
 Marie Bell (1900–1985), actress

International relations
Bègles is twinned with:
 Collado Villalba, Spain
 Suhl, Germany
 Bray, Ireland

See also
Communes of the Gironde department

References

External links

Official website (in French)

Communes of Gironde